Kivell is a surname. Notable people with the surname include:

Alfred Kivell (1897–1987), New Zealand rugby union player
David Kivell (1932–2022), New Zealand cricketer
Rex Nan Kivell (1898–1977), New Zealand-born British art collector

See also
Kivel